Reliant may also refer to:

 Reliant Energy, an energy corporation from Houston, Texas, United States
 Reliant Motors, a defunct British car manufacturer
 Reliant Pharmaceuticals, now owned by GlaxoSmithKline
 Stinson Reliant, a utility and trainer aircraft
 Hipp's Superbirds Reliant, an ultralight aircraft
 Hipp's Superbirds Reliant SX, an ultralight aircraft
 Plymouth Reliant, a North American car
 The Reliant UNIX, ex. SINIX
 , a US Navy Valiant-class tugboat

See also
Reliance (disambiguation)
Relient K, an American Christian rock band